Fruitland is an unincorporated community in Cape Girardeau County, Missouri, United States.

History
A post office called Fruitland was established in 1886, and remained in operation until 1968. The community was named for a fruit orchard near the original town site.

References

Unincorporated communities in Cape Girardeau County, Missouri
Cape Girardeau–Jackson metropolitan area
Unincorporated communities in Missouri